Marcelo Demoliner became the first champion of this tournament. He defeated Rogério Dutra da Silva in the final (6–1, 6–0).

Seeds

Draw

Final four

Top half

Bottom half

References
 Main Draw
 Qualifying Draw

Aberto de Tenis de Santa Catarina - Singles
2009 Singles